Lonicera quinquelocularis, known as translucent honeysuckle is a species of honeysuckle native to Afghanistan and China, where it reaches a height of 5 metres. The cream-white to yellow flowers occur from May to July, followed by translucent to milky coloured fruits.

References

quinquelocularis